The 4th Indonesian Choice Awards ceremony (Official name: NET. 4.O presents Indonesian Choice Awards 2017), presented by the NET., honored the best entertainment of the year in 2017, and took place on May 21, 2017, at the Sentul International Convention Center in Bogor, West Java, at 7:00 p.m. WIB. During the ceremony, NET. were presented Indonesian Choice Awards in 12 categories (totally 64 nominees, including a newest category Music Video of the Year), and a Lifetime Achievement Award.

The awards ceremony aired live on NET. coinciding with the fourth anniversary celebration, entitled NET 4.0. The annual awards have presented by Sarah Sechan, Vincent Rompies and Desta (2nd time overall). The nominees for this edition of ICA were first announced on April 25, 2017 by NET. via Twitter. In addition to featured musician, NET. also featuring to international musician and artists, such as Jonas Blue, Robin Thicke and American magician Tony Chapek. 

Musician songwriter Tulus received the most nominations with four and was the most biggest winner of the night for taking home three awards, followed behind by Raisa who only received two awards trophy. Other winners included GAC, who won Band/Group/Duo of the Year (for the second year running), Rich Chigga who won Breakthrough Artist of the Year, etc.

Legend musician Bimbo has receiving the "Lifetime Achievement Award" from the Chief of the Creative Economy Agency Triawan Munaf, for their contribution work during 5th decade.

Voting system
Voting for 2017 Indonesian Choice Awards opened on April 26, 2017 on Twitter, for hastag #ICA _4#<nominees_category>.

Performers

Non-song performances

Presenters
 Ririn Dwi Ariyanti, Dimas Seto and Maria Selena – Presented Actor of the Year
 Danang and Darto – Presented Actress of the Year
 Armand Maulana – Presented Creative and Innovative Person of the Year
 Chelsea Islan and Boy William – Presented Album of the Year
 Yuliandre Darwis – Presented TV Program of the Year
 Gista Putri and Tanta Ginting – Presented Male Singer of the Year
 Temmy Rahadi and Rahma Hayuningdyah – Presented Movie of the Year
 Sule and Andre Taulany – Presented Band/Duo/Group of the Year
 Triawan Munaf – Presented Lifetime Achievement Award
 Rizky Febian and Hesty Purwadinata – Presented Breakthrough of the Year
 Niken Anjani and Ibnu Jamil – Presented Female Singer of the Year
 Shahnaz Soehartono and Ganindra Bimo – Presented Music Video of the Year
 Deva Mahenra and Kimmy Jayanti – Presented Song of the Year

Winners and nominees
The full list of nominees and winners is as follows:

Music

Movie

Television

Other

Special award

References

2017 music awards
Indonesian Choice Awards